Lennox Lewis vs. Vitali Klitschko, billed as Battle of the Titans, was a heavyweight professional boxing match contested between WBC, IBO, and The Ring champion Lennox Lewis and former WBO champion Vitali Klitschko. The bout took place on June 21, 2003 at the Staples Center in Los Angeles, California. Lewis defeated Klitschko via sixth-round technical knockout (TKO) after the fight was stopped due to a severe cut above Klitschko's left eye. It was the last fight of Lewis' career, having decided to retire after eventually rejecting a rematch.

Background
A year earlier, Lennox Lewis had finally met Mike Tyson in the ring and achieved a landmark victory by knocking Tyson out in the eighth round of their record-breaking PPV fight. Following his victory, Lewis would take a year-long break from the ring, eventually vacating his IBF title after passing on the chance to face the IBF's number one contender Chris Byrd. Instead, Lewis turned his sights on a possible match with Vitali Klitschko, who had become the WBC's number one contender after defeating Larry Donald by tenth-round technical knockout. In early 2003, however, negotiations for the fight fell through and Lewis began looking into a lucrative rematch with Tyson. The WBC ruled that a rematch with Tyson would be allowed on the basis that the winner would next defend their title against Klitschko. Tyson passed on the rematch, forcing Lewis to accept a less marketable fight against Kirk Johnson in which only Lewis' IBO title would be on the line. Klitschko was to fight on the undercard and take on Lewis in December. Before the Lewis–Johnson fight could take place, Johnson was forced to pull out with a chest injury. As such, Lewis and Klitschko agreed to face one another on June 21, rather than later in the year as originally planned.

The fight
Though Klitschko came into the fight as the underdog, he was able to get off to a great start in the fight. Klitschko was the aggressor through the first two rounds and landed many hard shots to the head of Lewis, winning both rounds on all three judge's scorecards. In the second round, Klitschko was able to stagger Lewis with two hard right hands that opened a cut under Lewis' left eye. In the third round, Lewis came out aggressively and landed a strong right hand within the first 10 seconds that opened up a deep cut above Klitschko's left eye. Despite his injury, Klitschko fought a close round with Lewis as the two fighters traded jabs and power punches throughout the round though Lewis was able to win the round on the scorecards. Klitschko rebounded to take round four in which both fighters appeared to be fatigued. In round five, Lewis landed several consecutive hard punches to Klitschko's ribs with his right hand while in a clinch with Klitschko, with HBO commentators disagreeing on the legality of the punches. By the time round five had ended, the condition of Klitschko's eye had grown worse, with the corner camera broadcasting the severe open wound, but he was nevertheless allowed to continue into round six. Lewis took advantage of Klitschko's impaired vision to land a monstrous uppercut in the sixth round. By now both fighters looked exhausted, often staggering after coming together. Between rounds six and seven, it was determined by the ringside doctor that the damage to Klitschko's eye had become too severe and the fight was stopped. Because Klitschko's injury was a result of punches from Lewis, Lewis was named the winner of the fight by technical knockout. Klitschko was ahead 58–56 on the scorecards with two judges giving Lewis only rounds three and six and the other rounds five and six. The crowd proceeded to boo Lewis, and cheer Klitschko, presumably unhappy with the stoppage.

Aftermath
Due to the controversial ending, there was much demand for a rematch between the two. Lewis initially welcomed the idea, stating after his victory that he hoped to face Klitschko once more in either November or December 2003. Klitschko's eye injury had healed to the point that he had been cleared to face Lewis and a tentative date of December 6 was set for the rematch. In August, however, Lewis changed his mind and pulled out of the bout, stating his intentions to not fight at all for the remainder of 2003. Instead, Klitschko boxed Kirk Johnson in a WBC title eliminator on December 6, 2003 to determine who would face Lewis next. Klitschko easily dispatched Johnson, winning by second-round technical knockout, to set up a rematch with Lewis. However, Lewis announced his retirement two months later on February 7, 2004, vacating his titles in the process. Two months later, Klitschko met the WBC's number two ranked contender and then-reigning WBO champion Corrie Sanders, who had defeated Klitschko's brother Wladimir earlier in 2003, for the vacant WBC and The Ring heavyweight titles. Klitschko defeated Sanders, who relinquished his WBO title to fight Klitschko, by eighth-round technical knockout to capture the crown. The lineal title would not be contested again for five years until Wladimir beat Ruslan Chagaev in June 2009.

References

Klitschko
World Boxing Council heavyweight championship matches
2003 in boxing
Boxing in Los Angeles
2003 in sports in California
Klitschko brothers
June 2003 sports events in the United States
Nicknamed sporting events